The following is a list of notable structural engineering companies. Only companies with a Wikipedia article should be included in the list. Many of the companies included in this list do not practice only structural engineering, but may also be involved in civil engineering, architecture, and other related practices.

See also list of structural engineers and lists of engineers.

 


A 
 AKT II
 Arup Group
 Aurecon

D 
 Dar Al-Handasah

E 
 Expedition Engineering
 Exponent

G 
 Geiger Engineers

H 
 HDR

L 
 LeMessurier Consultants
 Louis Berger Group

M 
 Magnusson Klemencic Associates
 Miyamoto International
 Mott MacDonald

P 
 Popp & Asociații

R 
Rutherford + Chekene

S 
 Severud Associates
 Structuretech Engineering PC.
 Simpson Gumpertz & Heger Inc.
 Skidmore, Owings & Merrill

T 
 Thornton Tomasetti

V

W 
 Walter P Moore
 Weidlinger Associates
 Whitbybird
 Wiss, Janney, Elstner Associates, Inc.
 WSP Global
 WSP USA

References 

Engineering consulting firms
Companies